{{Taxobox
| name = 
| image = B151992-1.jpg
| image_caption = The nudibranch Okenia liklik, The River, Tulamben, Bali.
| regnum = Animalia
| phylum = Mollusca
| classis = Gastropoda
| unranked_superfamilia = clade Heterobranchia
clade Euthyneura
clade Nudipleura
clade Nudibranchia
clade Euctenidiacea
clade Doridacea
| superfamilia = Onchidoridoidea
| familia = Goniodorididae
| genus = Okenia
| species = O. liklik
| binomial = Okenia liklik| binomial_authority = Gosliner, 2004
}}Okenia liklik is a species of sea slug, specifically a dorid nudibranch, a marine gastropod mollusc in the family Goniodorididae.

Distribution
This species was described from Luzon Island, Philippines and Papua New Guinea.

Description
This Okenia'' has a broad body and eight or nine pairs of short lateral papillae. There is a crest composed of three or four short, partially fused, papillae on the back, in front of the gills. The body is translucent purple-pink and there is a broken white band which runs from between the rhinophores to the tail, encircling the back and gills. This band is broken and edged by brown patches and the dorsal crest is at its centre. There are two colour forms which may be different species. In the original description the papillae are orange with chocolate markings but in the other form they are tipped with white or pale yellow. The ridge of papillae in the middle of the back (dorsal crest) is pink in the original description, but white in the second colour form. The gills and rhinophores are also different in colour in the two forms.

Ecology
The diet of this species is not known.

References

External links 
 Okenia liklik at Philippine Sea Slugs
 

Goniodorididae
Gastropods described in 2004